Kamilla Farhad (born 18 January 1996) is an Azerbaijani tennis player.

On 7 November 2011, she reached her best singles ranking of world number 1141. On 10 October 2011, she peaked at world number 539 in the doubles rankings.

Farhad made her Women's Tennis Association tour debut at the inaugural 2011 Baku Cup as a wildcard, but lost in the first round to Aravane Rezaï of France. In the doubles tournament, she partnered with Nigina Abduraimova reached the quarterfinals before falling to Monica Niculescu and Galina Voskoboeva.

International Tennis Federation Junior Finals

Singles Finals (1–0)

Doubles finals (1–2)

External links
 
 

Azerbaijani female tennis players
Living people
1996 births
21st-century Azerbaijani women